A psychedelic experience (known colloquially as a trip) is a temporary altered state of consciousness induced by the consumption of a psychedelic substance (most commonly LSD, mescaline, psilocybin mushrooms, or DMT). For example, an acid trip is a psychedelic experience brought on by the use of LSD, while a mushroom trip is a psychedelic experience brought on by the use of psilocybin. Psychedelic experiences feature alterations in normal perception such as visual distortions and a subjective loss of self-identity, sometimes interpreted as mystical experiences. Psychedelic experiences lack predictability, as they can range from being highly pleasurable (known as a good trip) to frightening (known as a bad trip). The outcome of a psychedelic experience is heavily influenced by the person's mood, personality, expectations, and environment (also known as set and setting). 

Researchers have interpreted psychedelic experiences in light of a range of scientific theories, including model psychosis theory, filtration theory, psychoanalytic theory, entropic brain theory, integrated information theory, and predictive processing. Psychedelic experiences are also induced and interpreted in religious and spiritual contexts.

Etymology
The term psychedelic was coined by the psychiatrist Humphrey Osmond during written correspondence with author Aldous Huxley and presented to the New York Academy of Sciences by Osmond in 1957. It is derived from the Greek words  and  thus meaning "mind manifesting," the implication being that psychedelics can develop unused potentials of the human mind. The term trip was first coined by US Army scientists during the 1950s when they were experimenting with LSD.

Phenomenology
Despite several attempts that have been made, starting in the 19th and 20th centuries, to define common phenomenological structures of the effects produced by classic psychedelics, a universally accepted taxonomy does not yet exist.

Visual alteration
A prominent element of psychedelic experiences is visual alteration. Psychedelic visual alteration often includes spontaneous formation of complex flowing geometric visual patterning in the visual field. When the eyes are open, the visual alteration is overlaid onto the objects and spaces in the physical environment; when the eyes are closed the visual alteration is seen in the "inner world" behind the eyelids. These visual effects increase in complexity with higher dosages, and also when the eyes are closed. The visual alteration does not normally constitute hallucinations, because the person undergoing the experience can still distinguish between real and imagined visual phenomena, though in some cases, true hallucinations are present. More rarely, psychedelic experiences can include complex hallucinations of objects, animals, people, or even whole landscapes. Visual alterations also include other effects such as afterimages, shifting of color hues, and pareidolia.

Mystical experiences 

A number of studies by Roland R. Griffiths and other researchers have concluded that high doses of psilocybin and other classic psychedelics trigger mystical experiences in most research participants. Mystical experiences have been measured by a number of psychometric scales, including the Hood Mysticism Scale, the Spiritual Transcendence Scale, and the Mystical Experience Questionnaire. The revised version of the Mystical Experience Questionnaire, for example, asks participants about four dimensions of their experience, namely the "mystical" quality, positive mood such as the experience of amazement, the loss of the usual sense of time and space, and the sense that the experience cannot be adequately conveyed through words. The questions on the "mystical" quality in turn probe multiple aspects: the sense of "pure" being, the sense of unity with one's surroundings, the sense that what one experienced was real, and the sense of sacredness. Some researchers have questioned the interpretation of the results from these studies and whether the framework and terminology of mysticism are appropriate in a scientific context, while other researchers have responded to those criticisms and argued that descriptions of mystical experiences are compatible with a scientific worldview.

A group of researchers concluded in a 2011 study that psilocybin "occasions personally and spiritually significant mystical experiences that predict long-term changes in behaviors, attitudes and values".

Some research has found similarities between psychedelic experiences and non-ordinary forms of consciousness experienced in meditation and near-death experiences. The phenomenon of ego dissolution is often described as a key feature of the psychedelic experience.

Individuals who have psychedelic experiences often describe what they experienced as "more real" than ordinary experience. For example, the psychologist Benny Shanon, after observing ayahuasca trips, referred to "the assessment, very common with ayahuasca, that what is seen and thought during the course of intoxication defines the real, whereas the world that is ordinarily perceived is actually an illusion." Similarly, the psychiatrist Stanislav Grof described the LSD experience as "complex revelatory insights into the nature of existence… typically accompanied by a sense of certainty that this knowledge is ultimately more relevant and 'real' than the perceptions and beliefs we share in everyday life."

Bad trips 

A "bad trip" is a highly unpleasant psychedelic experience. A bad trip on psilocybin, for instance, often features intense anxiety, confusion, agitation, or even psychotic episodes. Bad trips can be connected to the anxious ego-dissolution (AED) dimension of the APZ questionnaire used in research on psychedelic experiences. As of 2011, exact data on the frequency of bad trips are not available. Some research suggests that the risk of a bad trip on psilocybin is higher when multiple drugs are used, when the user has a history of certain mental illnesses, and when the user is not supervised by a sober person.

In clinical research settings, precautions including the screening and preparation of participants, the training of the session monitors who will be present during the experience, and the selection of appropriate physical setting can minimize the likelihood of psychological distress. Researchers have suggested that the presence of professional "trip sitters" (i.e., session monitors) may significantly reduce the negative experiences associated with a bad trip. In most cases in which anxiety arises during a supervised psychedelic experience, reassurance from the session monitor is adequate to resolve it; however, if distress becomes intense it can be treated pharmacologically, for example with the benzodiazepine diazepam.

The psychiatrist Stanislav Grof wrote that unpleasant psychedelic experiences are not necessarily unhealthy or undesirable, arguing that they may have potential for psychological healing and lead to breakthrough and resolution of unresolved psychic issues. Drawing on narrative theory, the authors of a 2021 study of 50 users of psychedelics found that many described bad trips as having been sources of insight or even turning points in life.

Scientific models 
Link R. Swanson divides scientific frameworks for understanding psychedelic experiences into two waves. In the first wave, encompassing nineteenth- and twentieth-century frameworks, he includes model psychosis theory (the psychotomimetic paradigm), filtration theory, and psychoanalytic theory. In the second wave of theories, encompassing twenty-first-century frameworks, Swanson includes entropic brain theory, integrated information theory, and predictive processing.

Model psychosis theory 
Researchers studying mescaline in the early twentieth century and LSD in the mid-twentieth century took interest in these drugs as producing a temporary "model psychosis" that could assist researchers and medical students in understanding the experiences of patients with schizophrenia and other psychotic disorders.

Filtration theory 
Aldous Huxley and Humphrey Osmond applied the pre-existing ideas of filtration theory, which held that the brain filters what enters into consciousness, to explain psychedelic experiences (and it is from this paradigm that the term psychedelic is derived). Huxley believed that the brain was filtering reality itself and that psychedelics granted conscious access to "Mind at Large," whereas Osmond believed that the brain was filtering aspects of the mind out of consciousness. Swanson writes that Osmond's view seems "less radical, more compatible with materialist science, and less epistemically and ontologically committed" than Huxley's.

Psychoanalytic theory 
Psychoanalytic theory was the predominant interpretive framework in mid-twentieth-century psychedelic-assisted psychotherapy. For instance, Czech psychiatrist Stanislav Grof characterised psychedelic experiencing as "non-specific amplification of unconscious mental processes", and he analysed the phenomenology of the LSD experience (particularly the experience of what he termed psychospiritual death and rebirth) in terms of Otto Rank's theory of the unresolved memory of the primal birth trauma.

Entropic brain theory 
Entropic brain theory is a theory of consciousness proposed in 2014 by neuroscientist Robin Carhart-Harris and colleagues that was inspired by research on psychedelic drugs.

Integrated information theory 
Integrated information theory is a theory of consciousness proposing to explain all forms of consciousness, and has been applied specifically to psychedelic experiences by Andrew Gallimore.

Predictive processing 
Sarit Pink-Hashkes and colleagues have applied the predictive processing paradigm in neuroscience to psychedelic experiences in order to formalize the idea of the entropic brain.

In religious and spiritual contexts 

Alan Watts likened psychedelic experiencing to the transformations of consciousness that are undertaken in Taoism and Zen, which he says is, "more like the correction of faulty perception or the curing of a disease… not an acquisitive process of learning more and more facts or greater and greater skills, but rather an unlearning of wrong habits and opinions." Watts further described the LSD experience as, "revelations of the secret workings of the brain, of the associative and patterning processes, the ordering systems which carry out all our sensing and thinking."

According to Luis Luna, psychedelic experiences have a distinctly gnosis-like quality; it is a learning experience that elevates consciousness and makes a profound contribution to personal development. For this reason, the plant sources of some psychedelic drugs such as ayahuasca and mescaline-containing cacti are sometimes referred to as "plant teachers" by those using those drugs.

Furthermore, psychedelic drugs have a history of religious use across the world that extends back for hundreds or perhaps thousands of years. They are often called entheogens because of the kinds of experiences they can induce, however various entheogens happen to also be hypnotics (muscimol mushrooms), deliriants (jimsonweed) or atypical/quasi-psychedelics like cannabis. Some small contemporary religious movements base their religious activities and beliefs around psychedelic experiences, such as Santo Daime and the Native American Church.

See also
APZ questionnaire
Cannabis and time perception
Default mode network
Eight-circuit model of consciousness
Numinous experience
Philosophy of psychedelics
Psychedelic microdosing
Psychonautics

References

Further reading

 Grinspoon, Lester, & Bakalar, James. B. (Eds.). Psychedelic Reflections. (1983). New York: Human Sciences Press. p. 13-14 
 
 
 

Hallucinations
Psychedelia
de:Trip